William Howard Love (born August 14, 1957, in Dallas, Texas) is an American prelate. Love was the ninth bishop of the Episcopal Diocese of Albany, and he served in that role from 2007 until January 31, 2021. Beginning in April 2021, Love has served as Assistant Bishop of the Anglican Diocese of the Living Word.

Love is known for his support for a traditional definition of marriage and for his opposition to the blessing of same-sex unions; this stance led to his departure from the Episcopal Church. In October 2020, Love was found to have violated Episcopal Church doctrine and rules due to his unwillingness to permit same-sex unions to be blessed by clergy within the Albany diocese. In response to that finding, Love resigned from his position as bishop effective February 1, 2021. Love later requested that he be released from ordained ministry in the Episcopal Church; that request was granted by Presiding Bishop Michael Curry. In April 2021, Love was appointed Assistant Bishop of the Anglican Diocese of the Living Word, a diocese within the Anglican Church in North America.

Education, family, and early career
According to the Episcopal Diocese of Albany, Love is a Texas native; he earned a Bachelor of Arts in journalism from Southwest Texas State in 1980, a Master of Science degree in education from the State University of New York-Plattsburgh in 1988, and a master's degree in Divinity in 1991 from Nashotah House. Prior to becoming a priest, he served as an intelligence officer in the Air Force. Love was ordained a deacon in 1991 and a priest in 1992. He served as rector of St. Mary's Church in Lake Luzerne, New York for 14 years. Love married retired Air Force Colonel Karen Love in 1983; the Loves have two children and several grandchildren.

Bishop of the Episcopal Diocese of Albany

Love was elected bishop coadjutor of the Episcopal Diocese of Albany on March 25, 2006; he received the consent of the General Convention that summer in Columbus, Ohio. Love was consecrated as bishop coadjutor by Presiding Bishop Frank Griswold on September 16, 2006, at the Empire State Plaza in Albany. On February 4, 2007, Love was installed as the ninth bishop of Albany.

Love has consistently stood for an orthodox view of the Bible and for the stance of the Anglican Communion on matters of human sexuality. He asserts that "'the Bible is, in fact, the word of God. It’s not just some historic document that was written some 2,000-plus years ago, but [is] God’s revealed word.'" Regarding marriage, Love adheres to an orthodox interpretation of Scripture, affirming that sexual intimacy is reserved for marriage and that marriage is an opposite-sex union. Love takes the view that homosexually-oriented persons should remain celibate.

On January 19, 2008, Love celebrated the Eucharist at St. Andrew's Church in Albany while hosting a visit by Bonnie Anderson, president of the Episcopal Church's House of Deputies. A dialogue followed between progressives from Via Media and the more conservative representatives of the church, and "stressed unity and communication". Both liberals and conservatives in the diocese praised Love for attending the event.  The national church's web site posted a story about the event, quoting Bishop Love and several of the 300 attendees at the event.

In June 2008, under Love's leadership, the Episcopal Diocese of Albany passed a resolution stating that only heterosexual marriages would be celebrated within the diocese. After the resolution was passed, Bishop Love was quoted as stating that "the important thing ... is that God loves all people, regardless of where they might be in their life.  That doesn't necessarily mean he approves of all of our behaviors."

Love gained national attention at the Episcopal Church's July 2009 convention in Anaheim, California. At that convention, the Church passed a resolution allowing the blessing of same-sex unions.  At a news conference organized by a conservative Anglican group, Love said, "It is breaking my heart to see the church destroy itself"; however, he vowed to remain within the Episcopal Church nonetheless. Love continued to be in the news in October 2009, when he commented on the state of the church after the Vatican, in the apostolic constitution Anglicanorum coetibus, announced a canonical framework to integrate groups of disaffected Anglicans into the Roman Catholic Church. Love was quoted as saying, "What state we are in when we get through this, only God knows ..." He also acknowledged that two parishes in the Diocese of Albany were attempting to leave the Episcopal Church. Love granted Delegated Ecclesiastical Parish Oversight (DEPO)--a status where certain parishes remain a part of a diocese, but receive certain pastoral functions from a bishop outside that diocese—to three parishes. As of 2012, the parishes receiving DEPO were St. Luke's, Saranac Lake; St. George's, Schenectady; and St. John's, Essex.

Dissent and departure
In 2015, the General Convention of the Episcopal Church "sanctioned gay marriage across the American church but [allowed] the bishops of eight dioceses [including Albany] to opt out." In July 2018, the General Convention of the Episcopal Church passed a resolution allowing same-sex weddings to be performed in the eight dissenting dioceses. Love strongly opposed the resolution. In November 2018, he issued a pastoral directive banning same-sex weddings from being held by clergy in the Episcopal Diocese of Albany; in an accompanying letter, Love wrote: "Recent statistics show that The Episcopal Church is spiraling downward... I can’t help but believe that God has removed His blessing from this Church. Unless something changes, The Episcopal Church is going to die."

In response to Love's pastoral directive, Presiding Bishop Michael Curry placed Love on a partial ministry restriction. A June 12, 2020 disciplinary hearing was held to determine whether Love had violated church law by refusing to allow same-sex weddings to be conducted by Episcopal clergy in the Diocese of Albany. On October 2, 2020, a disciplinary panel ruled that Love had violated Episcopal doctrine and rules. On October 24, 2020, Love announced his resignation as bishop pursuant to a disciplinary agreement with church authorities. His resignation became effective on February 1, 2021.

On March 29, 2021, Love was—at his own request—released and removed from the ordained ministry by Presiding Bishop Michael Curry. On March 30, 2021, Love announced that he would be leaving ministry in the Episcopal church to join the Anglican Church in North America. (Earlier the same year, Love's predecessor as Bishop of Albany, Daniel W. Herzog, also announced that he was leaving ministry.) Four priests and four deacons left the Diocese of Albany in protest following Love's departure.

Assistant Bishop of the Anglican Diocese of the Living Word
The Anglican Diocese of the Living Word, a diocese within the ACNA, announced the appointment of Love as assisting bishop on April 3, 2021.

See also

 List of Episcopal bishops of the United States
 Historical list of the Episcopal bishops of the United States
 List of Bishop Succession in the Episcopal Church

References

1957 births
Living people
Anglo-Catholic bishops
Religious leaders from Albany, New York
Nashotah House alumni
Texas State University alumni
State University of New York at Plattsburgh alumni
American Anglo-Catholics
Bishops of the Anglican Church in North America
Episcopal bishops of Albany
21st-century American clergy
Anglican realignment people